Adrian Aleksander Hansen (born 3 September 2001) is a Norwegian football defender who plays for Mjøndalen.

Growing up in the club Konnerud IL, where he played senior football in 2018. He then joined Mjøndalen as a junior, albeit making his senior debut for them in the 2019 Norwegian Football Cup. In 2020 he was loaned out to Fram Larvik. He made his Eliteserien debut in July 2021 against Odd.

He is a son of Mjøndalen manager Vegard Hansen.

References

2001 births
Living people
Sportspeople from Drammen
Norwegian footballers
Mjøndalen IF players
IF Fram Larvik players
Eliteserien players
Association football defenders